Miss Brazil CNB 2017 was the 28th edition of the Miss Brazil CNB pageant and the 3rd under CNB Miss Brazil. The contest took place on August 12, 2017. Each state, the Federal District and various Insular Regions & Cities competed for the title. Beatrice Fontoura of Goiás crowned her successor, Gabrielle Vilela of Rio de Janeiro at the end of the contest. Vilela represented Brazil at Miss World 2017. The contest was held at the Hotel do Bosque in Angra dos Reis, Rio de Janeiro, Brazil.

Results

Regional Queens of Beauty

Special Awards

Challenge Events

Beauty with a Purpose

Beauty & Photography

Best in Interview

Fantasy & Creativity

Miss Popularity

Miss Talent

Miss Top Model

Night Fashion

Delegates
The delegates for Miss Brazil CNB 2017 were:

States

 - Caroline Andrade
 - Emili Seixas
 - Renata Miranda
 - Letícia Salles
 - Ingrid Coelho
 - Clara Aguiar
 - Bárbara Reis
 - Ana Carla Marques
 - Lorena Rodrigues
 - Emanuelle Costa
 - Rhayanny Nóbrega
 - Bruna Nogueira
 - Viviane Félix
 - Melissa Albuquerque
 - Gabrielle Vilela
 - Clarissa Matias
 - Daiane Savi
 - Suélly Miranda
 - Camilla Wolf
 - Daniele Arruda
 - Bárbara Monick

Insular Regions and Cities

 Águas de Bonito - Gabriely Paliga
 Atol das Rocas - Lara Vidian
 Brasília - Anna Lyssa Valim
 - Fernanda Oliveira
 Fernando de Noronha - Caroline Gross
 Greater Porto Alegre - Jéssica Aguiar
 Greater São Paulo - Marcella Marques
 Ilhabela - Thalita Xavier
 Ilha da Pintada - Monalisa Menezes
 Ilha dos Lobos - Amanda Brenner
 Ilhas do Araguaia - Quetlin Heidrich
 Jurerê Internacional - Carolina Schüler
 Marajó - Flávia Lacerda
 Pantanal (MT) - Natalia Rodrigues
 Pantanal (MS) - Yara Volpe
 Plano Piloto - Thayná Lima
 Rio de Janeiro Capital - Clara Fernandes
 São Paulo Capital - Dara Costa
 - Ana Flávia Modesto
 - Cristiane Busnardo
 Zona da Mata - Júlia Horta

Notes

Did not compete

 (competed as Miss Brasília)

References

External links
 (in Portuguese)

2017
2017 in Brazil
2017 beauty pageants
Beauty pageants in Brazil